"Topaze" is a 1966 Australian TV play based on the 1928 play by the French writer Marcel Pagnol.

Plot
Topaze is a school master sacked for being too honest who, subsequently, becomes involved with thieves.

Cast
Mark Albiston as Topaze
Fernande Glyn as Suzy
Allan Trevor as Castel-Benac
Patricia Kennedy as Baroness
Fay Kelton as Ernestine, daughter of the headmaster
Terry Norris as Tamise
Edward Howell as Journalist
Jack Allan as Muche
Robert Bogden as Roger
Peter Drake as Butler
Diana Wilson as Typist
Christie Clayton as Typist
Ron Hoenig as Pupil

Production
This was director Christopher Muir's first production back in Australia after six months abroad. It was the first locally produced edition of Wednesday Theatre for 1966. The production was given an Edwardian setting designed by Cass van Pufelen.

Muir said "essentially the play shows how men can be corrupted by power. Marcel Pagnol... begins all his plays as amusing, lighthearted comedies. However as the plot unfolds you find there's some extremely important point which he's trying to get across. In Topaze we see how a timid, almost stupid person becomes a cold hearted business tycoon. The peculiar twists of fate which produce a totally different man give you something to think about."

Reception
The Sydney Morning Herald said "Topaze is a fine French satire and the Melbourne production was impeccable... Nobody could complain about how it was done. But to the Australian people... of 1966 it could only look and sound like a fussy little piece about some French types who may have lived 40 years ago...The A.B.C. has no right to spend money, time and effort on a little show. In fact, the executives who selected Pagnol's play could take a cue from one line spoken by Fernunde Glyn: "I think you might go out and meet people"."

References

1966 television plays
1966 Australian television episodes
1960s Australian television plays
Wednesday Theatre (season 2) episodes
Adaptations of works by Marcel Pagnol